KRHD-CD (channel 40) is a low-power, Class A television station in Bryan, Texas, United States, serving the Brazos Valley as an affiliate of ABC. The station is owned by the E. W. Scripps Company, and maintains a news bureau and advertising sales office on Briarcrest Road in Bryan; its transmitter is located on US 190 northwest of the city in unincorporated Robertson County.

Although identifying as a separate station in its own right, KRHD-CD is considered a semi-satellite of KXXV (channel 25) in Waco. As such, it simulcasts all network and syndicated programming as provided through its parent station but airs separate local newscasts, commercial inserts and legal identifications, and has a different subchannel lineup. KRHD-CD serves the eastern half of the Waco–Temple–Bryan market while KXXV serves the western portion. The two stations are counted as a single unit for ratings purposes. Master control and some internal operations are based at KXXV's studios on South New Road in Waco.

History

KRHD signed on for the first time on June 15, 1990, as K22DP, a translator of KXXV. It changed its call sign to KRHD-LP in 1997.

KXXV/KRHD added a secondary affiliation with The WB on January 11, 2002, following the sale of the market's previous WB affiliate, KAKW (channel 62), to Univision. KXXV/KRHD aired The WB's prime time lineup after ABC's late night programming, as well as two hours of Kids' WB programming on Sunday mornings. In July 2002, KXXV/KRHD ceded the secondary WB affiliation to Fox affiliate KWKT (channel 44) and its Brazos Valley satellite KYLE (channel 28).

A planned late 2008 sale of the Drewry stations to London Broadcasting fell through due to the late 2000s credit crisis; London Broadcasting subsequently purchased KCEN-TV. On August 10, 2015, Raycom Media announced that it would purchase Drewry Communications for $160 million. The sale was completed on December 1.

Sale to Gray Television and resale to Scripps
On June 25, 2018, Atlanta-based Gray Television, owner of KWTX-TV and its semi-satellite KBTX-TV, announced it had reached an agreement with Raycom to merge their respective broadcasting assets (consisting of Raycom's 63 existing owned-and/or-operated television stations, including KXXV and KRHD, and Gray's 93 television stations) under Gray's corporate umbrella. The cash-and-stock merger transaction valued at $3.6 billion—in which Gray shareholders would acquire preferred stock currently held by Raycom—required divestment of either KXXV/KRHD or KWTX due to FCC ownership regulations prohibiting common ownership of two of the four highest-rated stations in a single market (as well as more than two stations in any market). Gray announced it would retain KWTX and KBTX, and sell KXXV and KRHD to an unrelated third party. On August 20, it was announced that the E. W. Scripps Company would buy KXXV/KRHD and sister station WTXL-TV in Tallahassee, Florida, for $55 million. The sale was completed on January 2, 2019.

News operation
KRHD maintains a fully staffed bureau of reporters and photographers stationed in Bryan.

KXXV simulcasts its morning newscast, Good Morning Texas and its 11 a.m. newscast, The Texas Report Midday on KRHD. Both programs feature stories from the main focus area of Waco–Temple–Killeen but also include some stories from Bryan–College Station and the Brazos Valley.

Until January 5, 2015, KXXV produced a taped 30-minute newscast for KRHD, called The ABC40 Nightbeat, that aired at 10 p.m. weekdays. The newscast incorporated stories produced by reporters stationed at the Bryan bureau.

KXXV relaunched KRHD as an independent news operation in the Brazos Valley on September 1, 2020, and added 10 more hours of news with newscasts airing during its 11:30 a.m. midday time slot, and 30-minute newscasts at 5 and 10 p.m., and a 60-minute program, 25 News at 6, airing at 6 p.m. The station brings Brazos Valley viewers stories focused more on community impact and special interest content, breaking away from a traditional newscast format.

KRHD launched Good Morning Texas on January 11, 2021, with morning newscasts airing at 5 and 6 a.m.

Technical information

Subchannels
The station's digital signal is multiplexed:

References

External links

RHD-CD
Low-power television stations in the United States
Television channels and stations established in 1993
1993 establishments in Texas
ABC network affiliates
Ion Mystery affiliates
TrueReal affiliates
E. W. Scripps Company television stations
Bryan, Texas